Terri Psiakis is an Australian comedian and a presenter on radio and television.

Radio
Psiakis is a Saturday morning presenter on Melbourne radio station Triple M. Previously she was a casual presenter on Triple J, and her appearances most notably included co-presenting the Ross and Terri show with Ross Noble. Terri was also a regular guest of the former afternoon show Top Shelf Radio with Robbie Buck.

Television
Psiakis has also appeared on the ABC's TV series Spicks and Specks and is a presenter on The Comedy Channel.

Publishing
Psiakis wrote a book based on her experiences at her wedding, Tying the Knot Without Doing Your Block.

References

External links
T n A Show's webpage
Ross and Terri webpage
The Quasi-Official Ross and Terri webpage

Triple J announcers
Australian people of Greek descent
Living people
Australian women comedians
Year of birth missing (living people)